Rene Gonzalez may refer to:

Rene Gonzales (born 1960), American former professional baseball infielder
René González (baseball player) (1918–1982), Cuban baseball player
Rene Gonzalez (politician), American politician based in Portland, Oregon
Rene Gonzalez Architects, an architecture firm